Gaelen Foley (born November 6, 1973) is an American author best known for writing romance novels set in the Regency era. She has also been self-publishing middle grade fantasy books under the pen name E.G. Foley since 2012. Her books have been in the USA Today bestseller list regularly since 2000 and the New York Times bestseller list since 2008. Gaelen's novels have been translated into 20+ foreign languages and have sold millions of copies worldwide.

Biography
Gaelen Foley is the eldest of four sisters. She holds a B.A. in English literature with a minor in philosophy from the State University of New York at Fredonia. After college, Foley wrote as much as she could in her free time while working a variety of odd jobs, including: waitressing, library assistant, and medical office staff. In that time, she wrote four full-length manuscripts, honing her craft, before the fifth was picked up by one of the Big Five (publishers), Random House. In 1998 her first romance novel, The Pirate Prince, was published and since then she has penned some 35+ novels.

Awards
National Readers' Choice
Booksellers' Best
Golden Leaf
Award of Excellence
Laurie
Romantic Times Reviewers' Choice Award for Best First Historical 
The Holt Medallion

Bibliography

Writing as Gaelen Foley

Ascension Trilogy
The Pirate Prince (1998) 
Princess (1999) 
Prince Charming (2000)

Knight Miscellany
The Duke (2000) 
Lord of Fire (2002) 
Lord of Ice (2002) 
Lady of Desire (2003) 
Devil Takes a Bride (2004) 
One Night of Sin (2005) 
His Wicked Kiss (2006)

Spice Trilogy
Her Only Desire (2007) 
Her Secret Fantasy (2007) 
Her Every Pleasure (2008)

Inferno Club
My Wicked Marquess (2009)
My Dangerous Duke (2010)
My Irresistible Earl (2011)
My Ruthless Prince (2012)
My Scandalous Viscount (2012)
My Notorious Gentleman (2013)
The Secrets of a Scoundrel (2014)

Age of Heroes
Paladin’s Prize (2015)

Harmony Falls
Dream of Me (2016)
Belong to Me (2017)

Moonlight Square
One Moonlit Night (2015)
Duke of Scandal (2015)
Duke of Secrets (2017)
Duke of Storm (2017)
Duke of Shadows (2018)

Writing as E.G. Foley

The Gryphon Chronicles
The Lost Heir (2012)
Jake & The Giant (2013)
The Dark Portal (2013)
The Gingerbread Wars (2013)
Rise of Allies (2014)
Secrets of the Deep (2016)
The Black Fortress

50 States of Fear
The Haunted Plantation (2014)
Bringing Home Bigfoot (2014)
Leader of the Pack (2014)
The Dork & The Deathray (2015)

References
http://www.gaelenfoley.com

External links

Official site

20th-century American novelists
21st-century American novelists
American romantic fiction writers
American women novelists
Living people
20th-century American women writers
21st-century American women writers
1973 births